"Air War" is a single by Crystal Castles. It was released on 17 December 2007 by Trouble Records as a 7" vinyl. An earlier version of the song was released in July 2006 as the B-Side to "Alice Practice" on Merok Records. The lyrics are from the 1922 James Joyce novel Ulysses in Chapter 11: Sirens. The cover art gathered public interest because of the odd picture of Ethan Kath and Alice Glass with ice cream cones as heads.

An official video was released in November 2008 as advertisement of "Toshiba Product Technology: Time Sculpture". The one-minute-long video was directed by Mitch Stratten. The video shows an empty room which features people making repeated movements. The advertisement was released to promote Toshiba's high-definition television upscaling technology in the United Kingdom.

An original music video was not released. The video was made in 2006, but the producer threw out the video due to its cover art leaking onto the Internet. The video shows Kath and Glass walking in the street with ice cream cone heads and giving people melting ice cream. It ends with Ethan and Alice entering an interdimensional portal and turning into ice cream cones. The video features a demo version of the song "Air War".

Track listing

7": Trouble UK

CD: So Sweet UK

References

External links
 

Crystal Castles (band) songs
2008 singles
Songs written by Ethan Kath
2007 songs
Ulysses (novel)
Music based on novels